Prajanchai (พระจันทร์ฉาย) is a Thai Muay Thai fighter currently signed to ONE Championship. He is a former ONE Strawweight Muay Thai World Champion. As of December 2020 he is the number 5 pound-for-pound fighter in the world according to The Nation.

Prajanchai is also a boxer who has won the WBA Asia South title at 126 lbs.

Boxing career
Prajanchai made his boxing debut on 29 August 2020, when he was scheduled to challenge the reigning WBA Asia South featherweight champion Arnon Yupang. Prajanchai won the fight by split decision, with scores of 96–94, 97–93 and 94–96.

In his second professional boxing bout, held on 31 October 2020, Prajanchai faced the former WBC Light Flyweight champion Kompayak Porpramook. He won the fight by unanimous decision, with all three judges awarding him all ten rounds of the bout.

Prajanchai was scheduled to face Suradech Ruhasiri on 24 April 2021. He won the fight by unanimous decision, once again taking all ten rounds on all the judges' scorecards.

Titles and accomplishments

Muay Thai

OneSongchai
 2012 S-1 112 lbs Champion
Rajadamnern Stadium
 2011 Rajadamnern Stadium 105 lbs Champion
 2012 Rajadamnern Stadium 112 lbs Champion
Lumpinee Stadium
 2014 Lumpinee Stadium 118 lbs Champion
 2020 Lumpinee Stadium 122 lbs Champion
ONE Championship
 2021 ONE Strawweight Muay Thai World Champion

Boxing

 2020 WBA Asia South 126 lbs Champion

Professional boxing record 

{|class="wikitable" style="text-align:center; font-size:95%"
|-
!
!Result
!Record
!Opponent
!Method
!Round, time
!Date
!Location
!Notes
|- 
|3
|Win
|3–0
|align=left| Suradech Ruhasiri
|
|10
|24 April 2021
|align=left| Suanlum Night Bazaar, Ratchadaphisek, Bangkok
|
|- 
|2
|Win
|2–0
|align=left| Kompayak Porpramook  
|
|10
|31 October 2020
|align=left| Suanlum Night Bazaar, Ratchadaphisek, Bangkok
|
|- 
|1
|Win
|1–0
|align=left| Arnon Yupang
|
|10
|29 August 2020
|align=left| Suanlum Night Bazaar, Ratchadaphisek, Bangkok
|

Fight record

|-  style="background:#cfc;"
| 2023-01-20|| Win ||align=left| Kompetch Sitsarawatsuer ||  ONE Friday Fights 1, Lumpinee Stadium || Bangkok, Thailand || Decision (Unanimous) || 3 || 5:00
|-  style="background:#fbb;"
| 2022-05-20|| Loss ||align=left| Joseph Lasiri ||  ONE 157 || Kallang, Singapore || TKO (Retirement) || 3 || 3:00 
|-
! style=background:white colspan=9 |
|-  style="background:#cfc;"
| 2021-07-30|| Win ||align=left| Sam-A Gaiyanghadao || ONE Championship: Battleground || Kallang, Singapore || Decision (Majority) || 5 || 3:00
|-
! style=background:white colspan=9 |
|-  style="background:#cfc;"
| 2021-03-28|| Win ||align=left| Ronachai Tor.Ramintra || Channel 7 Stadium || Bangkok, Thailand || Decision (Unanimous) || 5 || 3:00
|-  style="background:#cfc;"
| 2020-12-08|| Win ||align=left| Kompetch Sitsarawatsuer || Lumpinee Birthday Show, Lumpinee Stadium || Bangkok, Thailand || Decision || 5|| 3:00
|-  style="background:#fbb;"
| 2020-10-05||Loss ||align=left| Kompetch Sitsarawatsuer ||  R1 UFA, World Siam Stadium || Bangkok, Thailand || Decision||5 ||3:00
|-  style="background:#cfc;"
| 2020-02-11|| Win ||align=left| Petchsamarn Sor.Samarngarment || Lumpinee Stadium || Bangkok, Thailand || Decision || 5 || 3:00 
|-
! style=background:white colspan=9 |
|-  style="background:#cfc;"
| 2019-12-06|| Win||align=left| Petchsamarn Sor.Samarngarment || Lumpinee Stadium || Bangkok, Thailand || Decision || 5 || 3:00
|-  style="background:#c5d2ea;"
| 2019-11-02|| Draw|| align="left" | Sprinter Pangkongprab || Maximum Muay Thai Fight || Brazil, São Paulo || Decision || 5 || 3:00
|-  style="background:#cfc;"
| 2018-05-15|| Win||align=left| Worawute Baovigym || Lumpinee Stadium || Bangkok, Thailand || KO (Elbow) || 3 ||
|-  style="background:#fbb;"
| 2018-03-28|| Loss||align=left| Chalam Parunchai || WanParunchai + Poonseua Sanjorn  || Nakhon Si Thammarat, Thailand || Decision || 5 || 3:00
|-  style="background:#cfc;"
| 2018-01-24|| Win||align=left| Morakot Phetsimuen || Rajadamnern Stadium || Bangkok, Thailand || Decision || 5 || 3:00
|-  style="background:#cfc;"
| 2017-12-15|| Win||align=left| Morakot Phetsimuen || Lumpinee Stadium || Bangkok, Thailand || Decision || 5 || 3:00
|-  style="background:#cfc;"
| 2017-11-14|| Win ||align=left| Sprinter Pangkongprab|| Lumpinee Stadium || Bangkok, Thailand || Decision  || 5 || 3:00
|-  style="background:#cfc;"
| 2017-09-05|| Win ||align=left| Ronachai Tor.Ramintra || Lumpinee Stadium || Bangkok, Thailand || Decision  || 5 || 3:00
|-  style="background:#cfc;"
| 2017-08-03|| Win ||align=left| Kiewpayak Jitmuangnon || Rajadamnern Stadium || Bangkok, Thailand || Decision  || 5 || 3:00
|-  style="background:#fbb;"
| 2017-06-07|| Loss ||align=left| Morakot Phetsimuen || Rajadamnern Stadium || Bangkok, Thailand || Decision || 5 || 3:00
|-  style="background:#cfc;"
| 2017-03-30|| Win ||align=left| Puenkon Tor.Surat || Rajadamnern Stadium || Bangkok, Thailand || Decision || 5 || 3:00
|-  style="background:#fbb;"
| 2017-02-08|| Loss ||align=left| Puenkon Tor.Surat || Rajadamnern Stadium || Bangkok, Thailand || Decision || 5 || 3:00
|-  style="background:#cfc;"
| 2017-01-12|| Win ||align=left| Yodmungkol Muangsima || Rajadamnern Stadium || Bangkok, Thailand || Decision || 5 || 3:00
|-  style="background:#fbb;"
| 2016-09-30|| Loss ||align=left| Sing Parunchai || Lumpinee Stadium || Bangkok, Thailand || Decision || 5 || 3:00
|-  style="background:#cfc;"
| 2016-07-21|| Win ||align=left| Sing Parunchai || Rajadamnern Stadium || Bangkok, Thailand || Decision || 5 || 3:00
|-  style="background:#fbb;"
| 2016-05-22|| Loss ||align=left| Luknimit Singklongsi|| Rajadamnern Stadium || Bangkok, Thailand || Decision || 5 || 3:00
|-  style="background:#fbb;"
| 2016-04-29|| Loss ||align=left| Chalam Parunchai || Lumpinee Stadium || Bangkok, Thailand || Decision || 5 || 3:00
|-  style="background:#fbb;"
| 2016-03-31|| Loss ||align=left| Luknimit Singklongsi|| Rajadamnern Stadium || Bangkok, Thailand || Decision || 5 || 3:00
|-  style="background:#fbb;"
| 2016-03-04|| Loss ||align=left| Chalam Parunchai || Lumpinee Stadium || Bangkok, Thailand || Decision || 5 || 3:00
|-  style="background:#cfc;"
| 2015-12-23|| Win ||align=left| Phetnamngam Aor.Kwanmuang || Rajadamnern Stadium || Bangkok, Thailand || Decision || 5 || 3:00
|-  style="background:#cfc;"
| 2015-12-06|| Win ||align=left| Toma || The Battle of Muaythai 10～ The 10th anniversary || Yokohama, Japan || Decision (Unanimous) || 5 || 3:00
|-  style="background:#cfc;"
| 2015-10-14|| Win ||align=left| Yodmongkol Tor.Laksong || Rajadamnern Stadium || Bangkok, Thailand || Decision || 5 || 3:00
|-  style="background:#cfc;"
| 2015-09-05|| Win ||align=left| Yardfar R-Airline || Montri Studio || Thailand || Decision || 5 || 3:00
|-  style="background:#cfc;"
| 2015-08-07|| Win ||align=left| Phet Sawansangmanja || Lumpinee Stadium || Bangkok, Thailand || Decision || 5 || 3:00
|-  style="background:#cfc;"
| 2015-07-02|| Win ||align=left| Kengkla Por.Pekko || Rajadamnern Stadium || Bangkok, Thailand || Decision || 5 || 3:00
|-  style="background:#cfc;"
| 2015-05-28|| Win ||align=left| Chorfah Tor.Sangtiennoi || Rajadamnern Stadium || Bangkok, Thailand || Decision || 5 || 3:00
|-  style="background:#fbb;"
| 2015-05-07|| Loss ||align=left| Yodmungkol Muangsima || Rajadamnern Stadium || Bangkok, Thailand || Decision || 5 || 3:00
|-  style="background:#c5d2ea;"
| 2015-03-30|| Draw||align=left| Chorfah Tor.Sangtiennoi  || Rajadamnern Stadium || Bangkok, Thailand || Decision || 5 || 3:00
|-  style="background:#cfc;"
| 2015-02-12|| Win||align=left| Luknimit Singklongsi|| Rajadamnern Stadium || Bangkok, Thailand || Decision || 5 || 3:00
|-  style="background:#cfc;"
| 2015-01-08|| Win||align=left| Lamnapong Yuthachonburi || Rajadamnern Stadium || Bangkok, Thailand || KO || 4 ||
|-  style="background:#fbb;"
| 2014-12-09|| Loss||align=left| Panpayak Jitmuangnon || Lumpinee Stadium || Bangkok, Thailand || Decision || 5 || 3:00 
|-
! style=background:white colspan=9 |
|-  style="background:#fbb;"
| 2014-10-08|| Loss||align=left| Luknimit Singklongsi|| Rajadamnern Stadium || Bangkok, Thailand || Decision || 5 || 3:00
|-  style="background:#cfc;"
| 2014-09-05|| Win ||align=left| Panpayak Jitmuangnon || Lumpinee Stadium || Bangkok, Thailand || Decision || 5 || 3:00
|-
! style=background:white colspan=9 |
|-  style="background:#cfc;"
| 2014-08-14|| Win ||align=left| Chorfah Tor.Sangtiennoi || Rajadamnern Stadium || Bangkok, Thailand || Decision || 5 || 3:00
|-  style="background:#cfc;"
| 2014-07-16|| Win ||align=left| Maethee Sorjortoipadriw || Rajadamnern Stadium || Bangkok, Thailand || Decision || 5 || 3:00
|-  style="background:#cfc;"
| 2014-05-07|| Win ||align=left| Pichitchai P.K.Saenchaimuaythaigym || Rajadamnern Stadium || Bangkok, Thailand || Decision || 5 || 3:00
|-  style="background:#fbb;"
| 2014-02-28|| Loss||align=left| Mondam Sor Weerapol  || Lumpinee Stadium || Bangkok, Thailand || Decision || 5 || 3:00
|-  style="background:#cfc;"
| 2014-01-07|| Win ||align=left| Mondam Sor Weerapol  || Lumpinee Stadium || Bangkok, Thailand || Decision || 5 || 3:00
|-  style="background:#cfc;"
| 2013-12-03|| Win ||align=left| Eakmongkol Kaiyanghadaogym  || Lumpinee Stadium || Bangkok, Thailand || Decision || 5 || 3:00
|-  style="background:#cfc;"
| 2013-11-06|| Win ||align=left| Yodmongkon Muangseema  || Rajadamnern Stadium || Bangkok, Thailand || Decision || 5 || 3:00
|-  style="background:#cfc;"
| 2013-07-09|| Win||align=left| Wanchalong PK.Saenchai || Lumpinee Stadium || Bangkok, Thailand || Decision  || 5 || 3:00
|-  style="background:#fbb;"
| 2013-06-03|| Loss||align=left| Yokpet Sompongmataput || Lumpinee Stadium || Bangkok, Thailand || Decision  || 5 || 3:00
|-  style="background:#fbb;"
| 2013-04-05|| Loss ||align=left| Sangmanee Sor Tienpo || Lumpinee Stadium || Bangkok, Thailand || Decision || 5 || 3:00
|-  style="background:#cfc;"
| 2013-02-21|| Win ||align=left| Dang Sor Ploenchit || Rajadamnern Stadium || Bangkok, Thailand || Decision || 5 || 3:00
|-  style="background:#cfc;"
| 2012-12-24|| Win ||align=left| Lamnampong Noomjeantawana || Rajadamnern Stadium || Bangkok, Thailand || Decision || 5 || 3:00
|-  style="background:#fbb;"
| 2012-11-09|| Loss||align=left| Sangmanee Sor Tienpo || Lumpinee Stadium || Bangkok, Thailand || Decision || 5 || 3:00
|-
! style=background:white colspan=9 |
|-  style="background:#cfc;"
| 2012-10-11|| Win ||align=left| Densiam Aikbangzai  || Rajadamnern Stadium || Bangkok, Thailand || Decision || 5 || 3:00
|-  style="background:#cfc;"
| 2012-09-12|| Win ||align=left| Palangpon WatcharachaiGym || Rajadamnern Stadium || Bangkok, Thailand || Decision || 5 || 3:00
|-  style="background:#cfc;"
| 2012-06-26|| Win ||align=left| Pampun Kiatchongkao || Lumpinee Stadium || Bangkok, Thailand || Decision || 5 || 3:00
|-  style="background:#cfc;"
| 2012-05-17|| Win ||align=left| Meethee Kiatpratoom || Rajadamnern Stadium || Bangkok, Thailand || Decision || 5 || 3:00
|-  style="background:#cfc;"
| 2012-04-19|| Win ||align=left| Meethee Kiatpratoom || Rajadamnern Stadium || Bangkok, Thailand || Decision || 5 || 3:00
|-
! style=background:white colspan=9 |
|-  style="background:#cfc;"
| 2012-03-15|| Win ||align=left| Yardfar R-Airline  || Rajadamnern Stadium || Bangkok, Thailand || Decision || 5 || 3:00
|-  style="background:#cfc;"
| 2012-01-26|| Win ||align=left| Nguern Jitmuangnon  || Rajadamnern Stadium || Bangkok, Thailand || Decision || 5 || 3:00
|-  style="background:#fbb;"
| 2011-12-08|| Loss ||align=left| Meethee Kiatpratoom || Rajadamnern Stadium || Bangkok, Thailand || Decision || 5 || 3:00
|-  style="background:#cfc;"
| 2011-09-08|| Win ||align=left| Tuan Kor.Kampanart  || Rajadamnern Stadium || Bangkok, Thailand || Decision || 5 || 3:00
|-  style="background:#fbb;"
| 2011-08-18|| Loss ||align=left| Detkart Por.Pongsawang || Rajadamnern Stadium || Bangkok, Thailand || Decision || 5 || 3:00
|-
! style=background:white colspan=9 |
|-  style="background:#cfc;"
| 2011-07-21|| Win ||align=left| Lomtalay Sitsoung  || Rajadamnern Stadium || Bangkok, Thailand || Decision || 5 || 3:00
|-  style="background:#cfc;"
| 2011-06-02|| Win||align=left| Detkart Por.Pongsawang || Rajadamnern Stadium || Bangkok, Thailand || Decision || 5 || 3:00
|-  style="background:#fbb;"
| 2011-04-25|| Loss ||align=left| Detkart Por.Pongsawang || Rajadamnern Stadium || Bangkok, Thailand || Decision || 5 || 3:00
|-  style="background:#cfc;"
| 2011-02-21|| Win||align=left| Tee-Us Kor.Rachada || Rajadamnern Stadium || Bangkok, Thailand || Decision || 5 || 3:00
|-  style="background:#fbb;"
| 2011-01-20|| Loss||align=left| Tee-Us Kor.Rachada || Rajadamnern Stadium || Bangkok, Thailand || Decision || 5 || 3:00
|-  style="background:#cfc;"
| 2010-12-15|| Win||align=left| Yodthongthai Tor.Mahahin || Rajadamnern Stadium || Bangkok, Thailand || Decision || 5 || 3:00
|-  style="background:#cfc;"
| 2010-11-18|| Win||align=left| Sanchai Sitsarawat-G || Rajadamnern Stadium || Bangkok, Thailand || Decision || 5 || 3:00
|-  style="background:#fbb;"
| 2010-10-21|| Loss ||align=left| Superbank Mor Ratanabandit || Rajadamnern Stadium || Bangkok, Thailand || Decision || 5 || 3:00 
|-
! style=background:white colspan=9 |
|-  style="background:#fbb;"
| 2010-09-15|| Loss ||align=left| Superbank Mor Ratanabandit || Rajadamnern Stadium || Bangkok, Thailand || Decision || 5 || 3:00 
|-
! style=background:white colspan=9 |
|-  style="background:#cfc;"
| 2010-08-19|| Win||align=left| Daolookai Kiatpratoom || Rajadamnern Stadium || Bangkok, Thailand || Decision || 5 || 3:00
|-  style="background:#cfc;"
| 2010-07-15|| Win||align=left| Tiankao Tor.Sangtiennoi || Rajadamnern Stadium || Bangkok, Thailand || Decision || 5 || 3:00
|-  style="background:#cfc;"
| 2010-06-10|| Win||align=left| Tiankao Tor.Sangtiennoi || Rajadamnern Stadium || Bangkok, Thailand || Decision || 5 || 3:00
|-  style="background:#cfc;"
| 2010-05-13|| Win ||align=left| Mondam Sor Weerapol  || Lumpinee Stadium || Bangkok, Thailand || Decision || 5 || 3:00
|-  style="background:#fbb;"
| 2010-04-06 || Loss||align=left| Petpanomrung Kiatmuu9 || Petchyindee Fights, Lumpinee Stadium || Bangkok, Thailand || Decision || 5 || 3:00
|-  style="background:#fbb;"
| 2010-03-11|| Loss||align=left| Chaidet Sor.Suriya || Lumpinee Stadium || Bangkok, Thailand || Decision || 5 || 3:00
|-  style="background:#cfc;"
| 2010-02-11|| Win||align=left| Yodthongthai Tor.Mahahin || Rajadamnern Stadium || Bangkok, Thailand || Decision || 5 || 3:00
|-  style="background:#cfc;"
| 2010-01-14|| Win||align=left| Superbank Mor Ratanabandit || Rajadamnern Stadium || Bangkok, Thailand || Decision || 5 || 3:00
|-  style="background:#fbb;"
| 2009-12-10|| Loss||align=left| Yodthongthai Tor.Mahahin || Rajadamnern Stadium || Bangkok, Thailand || Decision || 5 || 3:00
|-  style="background:#cfc;"
| 2009-11-05|| Win||align=left| Anuwatlek Por.Telakun || Rajadamnern Stadium || Bangkok, Thailand || Decision || 5 || 3:00
|-  style="background:#c5d2ea;"
| 2009-10-08|| Draw||align=left| Anuwatlek Por.Telakun || Rajadamnern Stadium || Bangkok, Thailand || Decision || 5 || 3:00
|-  style="background:#cfc;"
| 2009-09-17|| Win||align=left| Jomyuthjiew Wor.Rungtavee || Rajadamnern Stadium || Bangkok, Thailand || Decision || 5 || 3:00
|-  style="background:#cfc;"
| 2009-08-27|| Win||align=left| Daolookai Kiatpratoom || Rajadamnern Stadium || Bangkok, Thailand || Decision || 5 || 3:00
|-  style="background:#cfc;"
| 2009-08-06|| Win||align=left| Petrajan FA.Group || Rajadamnern Stadium || Bangkok, Thailand || Decision || 5 || 3:00
|-  style="background:#cfc;"
| 2009-06-18|| Win||align=left| Petdam Petnoppakao || Rajadamnern Stadium || Bangkok, Thailand || Decision || 5 || 3:00
|-  style="background:#cfc;"
| 2009-05-28|| Win||align=left| Tiankao Tor.Sangtiennoi || Rajadamnern Stadium || Bangkok, Thailand || Decision || 5 || 3:00
|-  style="background:#fbb;"
| 2009-05-07|| Loss||align=left| Tiankao Tor.Sangtiennoi || Rajadamnern Stadium || Bangkok, Thailand || Decision || 5 || 3:00
|-  style="background:#cfc;"
| 2009-04-09|| Win||align=left| Fahsai Sitsangluanglek || Rajadamnern Stadium || Bangkok, Thailand || Decision || 5 || 3:00
|-  style="background:#cfc;"
| 2009-02-26|| Win||align=left| Fahsai Sitsangluanglek || Rajadamnern Stadium || Bangkok, Thailand || Decision || 5 || 3:00
|-  style="background:#cfc;"
| 2009-02-05|| Win||align=left| Wanmechai Sor.Kongkaderd || Rajadamnern Stadium || Bangkok, Thailand || Decision || 5 || 3:00
|-  style="background:#fbb;"
| 2009-01-08|| Loss||align=left| Wanmechai Sor.Kongkaderd || Rajadamnern Stadium || Bangkok, Thailand || Decision || 5 || 3:00
|-  style="background:#cfc;"
| 2008-12-18|| Win||align=left| Petanun Chor.Tiangtum|| Rajadamnern Stadium || Bangkok, Thailand || Decision || 5 || 3:00
|-
| colspan=9 | Legend:

References

Prajanchai P.K.Saenchaimuaythaigym
ONE Championship kickboxers
Living people
1995 births
Prajanchai P.K.Saenchaimuaythaigym
Prajanchai P.K.Saenchaimuaythaigym
ONE Championship champions